A sliver is a long bundle of fibre that is generally used to spin yarn. A sliver is created by carding or combing the fibre, which is then drawn into long strips where the fibre is parallel. When sliver is drawn further and given a slight twist, it becomes roving.

Worsted textiles differ from woolen textiles in that, after carding, they are subjected to gilling, a process to make sure the sliver has a more uniform linear weight, and lubricants are added.

See also 
ISO 2

Notes

Spinning
Fibers